Xenosoma nigromarginatum is a moth in the subfamily Arctiinae first described by Herbert Druce in 1886. It is found in Costa Rica.

References

Arctiinae